Inside the Real Narcos is an 2018 docu-series starring the former member of the British Special Forces Jason Fox. It follows the real narcos performing drug trade in Mexico, Colombia and Peru.

Premise
Inside the Real Narcos stars the former member of the British Special Forces Jason Fox, and follows real narcos performing the drug trade in Mexico, Colombia and Peru, and interviewing members of the drug trade in Latin America.

Cast
 Jason Fox

Release
It was released on December 14, 2018 on Netflix streaming.

References

External links
 
 
 

2010s American documentary television series
2018 American television series debuts
English-language Netflix original programming
Netflix original documentary television series
Works about Mexican drug cartels
Works about Colombian drug cartels